Tangorin is a rural town and locality in the Flinders Shire, Queensland, Australia. In the  the locality of Tangorin had a population of 58 people.

Indigenous language 
Jirandali (also known as Yirandali, Warungu, Yirandhali) is an Australian Aboriginal language of North-West Queensland, particularly the Hughenden area. The language region includes the local government area of the Shire of Flinders, including Dutton River, Flinders River, Mount Sturgeon, Caledonia, Richmond, Corfield, Winton, Torrens, Tower Hill, Landsborough Creek, Lammermoor Station, Hughenden, and Tangorin.

History 
Tangorin Provisional School opened in 1902 and closed in 1905. Opened in 1902 and after several temporary closures finally closed in 1905.

Cameron Downs State School opened on 23 January 1967.

In the  the locality of Tangorin had a population of 58 people.

Education 
Cameron Downs State School is a government primary (Early Childhood-6) school for boys and girls at Hughenden-Muttaburra Road. In 2018, the school had an enrolment of 8 students with 2 teachers and 2 non-teaching staff.

References

External links 

 

Towns in Queensland
Shire of Flinders (Queensland)
Localities in Queensland